Eva Podzimková, née Josefíková (born 3 February 1990) is a Czech film and stage actress. She studied at the Faculty of Theatre (Prague).

Selected filmography
The Don Juans (2013)
Fair Play (2014)
1864 (television, 2014)

References

External links

1990 births
Living people
Czech film actresses
People from Uherské Hradiště
21st-century Czech actresses
Academy of Performing Arts in Prague alumni
Czech stage actresses
Czech voice actresses
Czech television actresses